Shawi or Šāwi Arabic is the Arabic dialect of the sheep-rearing Bedouins of Syro-Mesopotamia. The term Šāwi typically refers to the tribes living between the Tigris and the Euphrates, but many tribes are also found elsewhere, such as northern Jordan, Palestine, western Syria, and Lebanon. The dialect of the Arabs of Urfa also belongs to the Šāwi-Bedouin group.

Classification 
Cantineau (1936) was the first classification the dialects of the sheep breeders of northern Arabia. He was the first to coin the terminology ‘petit-nomades’ (sheep breeders) and ‘grand-nomades’ (camel breeders). The Shawi dialects typically represent the ‘petit-nomades’ type.

The hallmark of Shawi dialects is the affrication of Old Arabic *k and *g (< *q) in front environments into č [t͡ʃ] and ǧ [d͡ʒ], respectively, as opposed to the north Arabian camel-breeder varieties, which exhibit ć [t͡s] and ź [d͡z].

History 
Shawi tribes constitute the first recognized Bedouin migration wave from northern Arabia. Local traditions and some studies date their arrival to one millennium ago, although older migrations are likely for some clans.

Phonology

Consonants

Vowels

References

Arabic language